Fabio Trinidade da Silveira (born 26 May 1977 in Pantano Grande, Rio Grande do Sul), commonly known as Fabinho, is a Brazilian footballer who plays as a forward. He is currently a free agent.

Club career

Randers 
Fabinho got a good start of 2008. Due to Randers FC's new strikers Marc Nygaard and Søren Berg, Fabinho found himself sidelined in the first two matches. However, he was used as a substitute in the first two matches against Brøndby IF. In both games, Fabinho managed to score a goal as the only one on the Randers FC team. However this was not enough to secure victory since Randers FC lost both games.

Fabinho proved his value as a late sub again on April 19 when Randers FC played against FC Copenhagen. Fabinho scored the winning goal in the ending minutes.

Herfølge & HB Køge 
In 2008, Fabinho signed with former Danish Champions, Herfølge Boldklub. After a good season for Fabinho, Herfølge merged with Køge Boldklub to form new team HB Køge. Fabinho currently plays for HB Køge in the highest Danish division.

External links
 Official website
Randers FC profile
 Herfølge profile
AC Management profile

1977 births
Living people
Brazilian footballers
Randers FC players
Danish Superliga players
Herfølge Boldklub players
HB Køge players
Expatriate men's footballers in Denmark
Association football forwards